Gopalganj-1 is a constituency represented in the Jatiya Sangsad (National Parliament) of Bangladesh since 1996 by Faruk Khan of the Awami League.

Boundaries 
The constituency encompasses Muksudpur Upazila and seven union parishads of Kashiani Upazila: Kashiani, Mamudpur, Maheshpur, Parulia, Rajpat, Ratail, and Sajail.

History 
The constituency was created in 1984 from a Faridpur constituency when the former Faridpur District was split into five districts: Rajbari, Faridpur, Gopalganj, Madaripur, and Shariatpur.

Members of Parliament

Elections

Elections in the 2010s

Elections in the 2000s

Elections in the 1990s

References

External links
 

Parliamentary constituencies in Bangladesh
Gopalganj District, Bangladesh